The Ministries of the Dominican Republic (Spanish: Ministerios de la República Dominicana) are the primary units of the executive branch of the government of the Dominican Republic. These offices were formerly known as Secretaries of State (Spanish: Secretarias de Estado), but that denominations changed on 2010, with the Constitutional reform. The change was effective on February 6, 2010, by Decree no. 55–10.

The history of these offices can be traced to the first Constitution of the Dominican Republic, signed at San Cristóbal, on November 6, 1844. The first four institutions, known as Secretaries of State, were: Justice and Public Instruction; the Interior and Police; Finance and Commerce; and War and Navy. As of February, 2023, the Dominican Republic has a total of 24 Ministries, including the General Attorney's Office.

Ministries are analogous to Departments and Secretaries of State in others nations.

Council of Ministers 

The heads of the ministries, known as Ministers of their respective department, form the traditional Cabinet of the Dominican Republic, an executive organ that serves at the disposal of the president for the coordination of the government affairs and normally act as an advisory body to the presidency.

Out of the 24 Ministries, only 3 are women, as of February 2023.

Current Ministries 

As of February, 2023, the Dominican Republic has a total of 24 Ministries, the latest being the Ministry of Housing and Constructions, established on 2021. Below, a table listing all Ministries, the year they were created and their initial name.

Notes

References 

Government of the Dominican Republic